{{DISPLAYTITLE:Technetium (99mTc) votumumab}}

Technetium (99mTc) votumumab (trade name HumaSPECT) is a human monoclonal antibody labelled with the radionuclide technetium-99m. It was developed for the detection of colorectal tumors, but has never been marketed.

The target of votumumab is CTAA16.88, a complex of cytokeratin polypeptides in the molecular weight range of 35 to 43 kDa, which is expressed in colorectal tumors.

References

Radiopharmaceuticals
Technetium-99m
Abandoned drugs
Technetium compounds
Antibody-drug conjugates